Samuel W. Bell (born July 7, 1989) is an American geologist and politician who serves in the Rhode Island State Senate representing the 5th district in Providence. A Democrat, he was first elected to the senate in the 2018 elections, and assumed office in 2019. Bell is a member of the Democratic Socialists of America.

Background
Bell attended Amherst College were he earned a Bachelor's degree in Astronomy and Geology. Bell also attended Brown University were he earned a Master's degree in Geosciences and a PhD in Earth, Environmental, and Planetary Science. When not in the senate, Bell works as a geologist.

Political career
Bell decided to become involved in politics as a result of the Sandy Hook Elementary School shooting in Newtown, Connecticut in 2012. Bell defeated incumbent senator Paul Jabour in the Democratic primary in September 2018, and ran unopposed in the general election. He assumed office on January 1, 2019.

Bell ran for re-election in 2020, being challenged in the Democratic primary by majority leader of the Providence City Council Jo-Ann Ryan. Bell defeated Ryan by 50 percentage points, and ran unopposed in the general election.

In 2022, Bell proposed legislation that "would impose fines and double the taxes of those who refuse COVID-19 vaccine".

Personal life
Bell is married to Samantha Weiser, a chairwoman of the Rhode Island Democratic Women's Caucus who also works for Hasbro. Bell and his wife are both Jewish and identify as bisexual. They live together in Mount Pleasant. In October 2018, Bell publicly alleged that he and his wife were personally targeted with antisemitic and homophobic posts from users of the neo-Nazi forum website Stormfront.

Bell and Weiser have one son, born in December 2021, who was diagnosed with infant respiratory distress syndrome after birth.

See also
List of Democratic Socialists of America who have held office in the United States
List of LGBT Jews

Explanatory notes

References

External links

1989 births
21st-century American geologists
21st-century American politicians
Amherst College alumni
Bisexual men
Bisexual politicians
Brown University alumni
Brown University faculty
Bisexual Jews
LGBT state legislators in Rhode Island
Living people
Democratic Socialists of America politicians from Rhode Island
Politicians from Providence, Rhode Island
Rhode Island socialists
Democratic Party Rhode Island state senators